Trymosternus is a genus of beetles in the family Carabidae, containing the following species:

 Trymosternus acutangulus Mateu, 1963
 Trymosternus ariasi Bolivar Y Pieltain, 1914
 Trymosternus bolivari Mateu, 1952
 Trymosternus cobosi Mateu, 1952 
 Trymosternus colombati Antoine, 1934 
 Trymosternus cordatus (Rambur, 1837)
 Trymosternus dilaticollis (Lucas, 1846)
 Trymosternus negrei Mateu, 1952
 Trymosternus onychinus (Dejean, 1825)
 Trymosternus refleximargo Chaudoir, 1873 
 Trymosternus truncatus (Rambur, 1837)
 Trymosternus urcitanus Mateu, 1963

References

Lebiinae